Peruvian professional football club Cienciano has participated in 10 editions of club competitions governed by CONMEBOL, the chief authority in South American football. These include 6 seasons in the Copa Libertadores, 3 seasons in the Copa Sudamericana, and 1 match in the Recopa Sudamericana. The club plays its home matches at the Estadio Garcilaso but has used the Estadio Monumental Virgen de Chapi on more than one occasion for international competitions. They are the only Peruvian football club to have won CONMEBOL-sanctioned international competitions having won both the Copa Sudamericana and the Recopa Sudamericana in 2003 and 2004 respectively.

Overall

Matches

Copa Libertadores

Copa Sudamericana

Recopa Sudamericana

References

Cienciano